Sangarédi Airport  is an airport serving Sangarédi in Guinea.

The runway length includes a  overrun at the north end.

See also

Transport in Guinea
List of airports in Guinea

References

External links
OpenStreetMap - Sangarédi Airport
 OurAirports - Sangarédi
 FallingRain - Sangarédi Airport

 Google Earth

Airports in Guinea